The Kempe Award, established in 1984 and first awarded in 1985, is presented every two years to "an outstanding young professional or organization working in any discipline in the field of child abuse and neglect." Since 1986, it has been presented by the International Society for the Prevention of Child Abuse and Neglect. The award is named after C. Henry Kempe, a pioneer in the identification of child abuse.

Award recipients 

 2016 – David Finkelhor (USA), Pooja Taparia (India), Franziska Meinck (England)
 2014 – R. Kim Oates (Australia)
 2012 – R. Kim Oates (Australia)
 2010 – John Leventhal, MD (USA)
 2008 – Vidya Reddy (India)
 2006 – Fu-Yong Jiao (China)
 2004 – Heather Taussig (USA)
 2002 – Jordan River Foundation (Jordan)
 2000 – Patricia Ip (Hong Kong)
 1998 – Indian Council for Child Welfare (India) 
 1996 – The Center for Children's Rights (Thailand)
 1994 – National Movement of Street Children in Brazil (Brazil)
 1992 – PANIAMOR (Costa Rica)
 1990 – NEWPIN New Parent-Infant Network (England)
 1988 – Philista Onyango (Kenya)
 1986 – George W. Brown (USA)
 1985 – James Garbarino (USA)

Footnotes

External links
The Kempe Foundation for the Prevention and Treatment of Child Abuse and Neglect

Child abuse